Wayne Benn (born 7 August 1976) is an English football manager/coach and a former professional footballer.

Playing career
Benn began his career at Bradford City before he signed for local rivals Bradford Park Avenue in 1995, upon his release from City. He played in over 400 games for the club, as a sweeper or in central midfield. He briefly played on loan at Halifax Town before returning to Avenue in September 1996. He was player of the season in 1998–99. He left on a permanent basis in January 2004, signing for Frickley Athletic. In November 2004, he left for Emley before moving to Ossett Town in the Northern Premier League.

Managerial career
Benn took over as manager of South Kirkby Colliery in July 2010. He had previously worked as the assistant manager at Guiseley and Bradford Park Avenue. He left South Kirkby Colliery at the end of the 2010–11 seasons and became the manager of Hemsworth Miners Welfare, of the Northern Counties East Football League. Benn left to become the manager at Goole in the Northern Premier League but later returned to manage Hemsworth.

References

External links

1976 births
Living people
Sportspeople from Pontefract
Bradford City A.F.C. players
Bradford (Park Avenue) A.F.C. players
Halifax Town A.F.C. players
Frickley Athletic F.C. players
Wakefield F.C. players
Ossett Town F.C. players
South Kirkby Colliery F.C. managers
Association football midfielders
English footballers
English football managers